The Malawi men's national under-18 basketball team is a national basketball team of Malawi, governed by the Basketball Association of Malawi.
It represents the country in international under-18 (under age 18) basketball competitions.

The team appeared at the 2010 FIBA Africa Under-18 Championship qualification stage.

See also
Malawi men's national basketball team

References

External links
Archived records of Malawi team participations

Basketball teams in Malawi
Men's national under-18 basketball teams
Basketball